Euxesta cavagnaroi is a species of ulidiid or picture-winged fly in the genus Euxesta of the family Ulidiidae.

References

cavagnaroi
Insects described in 1966